The Epureni is a left tributary of the river Mihona in Romania. It flows into the Mihona in the village Epureni.

References

Rivers of Romania
Rivers of Vaslui County